P.A.S. Preveza, Football Athletic Club of Preveza, is a football club based in Preveza in South-West Epirus, Greece.
Club's emblem shows a hippocampus, which is the emblem of the city of Preveza. The colours of the club are yellow and black.

History
Established 1963 when A.E. Nikopolis and A.E. Preveza merged.
P.A.S. Preveza was one of the founding members of the Second Division (Beta Ethniki Katigoria). Played for two years (1963–64 and 1969–70). Since then the club played between the Third Division (Gamma Ethniki) -11 times- and Fourth Division (D' Ethniki or Amateur or Regional) -17 times- Categories of Greek football.

Club honours
 1 Championship 1996-97 D' Ethniki (Group 4)
 1 Championship 2006-07 Regional (Group 5)
 1 E.P.S. Preveza-Lefkada Cup 2006-07
 Amateur Cup 2002-03 Runner-Up (lost to Veria 1-2)

Stadium
Municipal Stadium is in Preveza, Greece. It is the home ground for the football section of P.A.S. Preveza and other sports clubs of the area, mostly athletics.
Name: 	Athanasia Tsoumeleka Municipal Stadium

Location: 	Preveza, Greece

Year Built: 	

Capacity: 	1,500

Owner:

Operator:         P.A.S. Preveza

Former & Present Players
 Anastasiou Ioannis
 Balafas Demetrios
 Balavigias Sotirios
 Bellos Spyridon
 Biris Alexandros
 Chaidakis Spyridon
 Chasiotis Antonios
 Chatzivasiliades Vasilios
 Chavos Kosmas
 Chiras Theodoros
 Cholevas Christos
 Christodoulou Georgios
 Dimas Christos
 Dimas Thomas
 Dimoulias Konstantinos
 Eleftheriades Elias
 Fekkas Konstantinos
 Georgiades Lampros
 Georgopanis Nikolaos
 Giahritsis Loukas
 Giannos Georgios
 Gougoulis Konstantinos
 Iliadis Ioannis
 Jones Shalimar (NED)
 Kalaitzides Alexandros
 Kapouranis Thomas
 Kartsaklis Athanasios
 Kazoukas Ioannis
 Kouventaris Athanasios
 Lainas Konstantinos
 Lazaridis Demetrios
 Louskos Konstantinos
 Maglaras Konstantinos
 Maris Demetrios
 Markos Vasilios
 Masouras Panagiotis
 Milionis Athanasios
 Mitsios Eleftherios
 Moutsios Athanasios
 Paleogiannis Georgios
 Papadopoulos Panagiotis
 Papanikolou Nikolaos
 Pappas Demetrios
 Psomiades Michael
 Sihloimiris Alexandros
 Sinaides Panagiotis
 Siskas Vasilios
 Spyrakos Apostolos
 Tarasiades Vasilios
 Theologou Pantelis
 Tsoutsis Thomas
 Tzavaras Andreas
 Tzimas Konstantinos
 Vartziotis Christos
 Vestakis Eleftherios
 Vlahos Georgios
 Zachos Iosif
 Zois Ioannis

Former & Present Coaches
 Dimoulitsas Thomas
 Gounaris Ioannis
 Leventakos Vasilios
 Xanthopoulos Vasilios
 Vassiliadis Thomas
 Panagiotidis Kiriakos
 Amarantos Kostas

External links
Official Website

 
Football clubs in Epirus
1963 establishments in Greece
Association football clubs established in 1963